Roostoja is a village in Alutaguse Parish, Ida-Viru County in northeastern Estonia. Its postal code is 42209.

References

 

Villages in Ida-Viru County
Alutaguse Parish